Rumpelstiltskin is a fairy tale.

Rumpelstiltskin may also refer to:

Characters
 Rumplestiltskin (Once Upon a Time), from the American TV series Once Upon a Time
 Rumpelstiltskin (Shrek), from the Shrek film series

Film
 Rumpelstiltskin (1915 film), an American silent film, directed by Raymond B. West
 Rumpelstiltskin (1940 film), a German fantasy film, directed by  Alf Zengerling
 Rumpelstiltskin (1955 film), a German fantasy film, directed by Herbert B. Fredersdorf
 Rumpelstiltskin (1985 film), a twenty-four-minute animated feature
 Rumpelstiltskin (1987 film), an American-Israeli film
 Rumpelstiltskin (1995 film), an American horror film, loosely based on the Grimm fairy tale
 Rumpelstilzchen (2009 film), a German TV adaptation of the fairy tale starring Gottfried John and Julie Engelbrecht

Other uses
 Rumpelstiltskin (album), a 1992 album by Tangerine Dream
 Rumplestiltskin (horse) (foaled 2003), an Irish Thoroughbred racehorse
 Rumpelstiltskin (musical), a 2011 American stage musical
 "Rumpelstiltskin" (Faerie Tale Theatre), a television episode
 "Rumpelstilskin", an episode of Super Why!